Hydrophilini is a tribe in the subfamily Hydrophilinae of aquatic beetles that contains 204 species in 7 genera.

Genera
 Brownephilus
 Hydrobiomorpha
 Hydrochara
 Hydrophilus
 Protistolophus
 Sternolophus
 Tropisternus

References

Polyphaga tribes
Hydrophilinae